Anadasmus is a genus of moths in the subfamily Stenomatinae.

Species
Anadasmus accurata (Meyrick, 1916)
Anadasmus anceps (Butler, 1877)
Anadasmus arenosa (Meyrick, 1916)
Anadasmus byrsinitis (Meyrick, 1912)
Anadasmus caliginea (Meyrick, 1930)
Anadasmus capnocrossa (Meyrick, 1925)
Anadasmus chlorotrota (Meyrick, 1932)
Anadasmus endochra (Meyrick, 1925)
Anadasmus germinans (Meyrick, 1925)
Anadasmus incitatrix (Meyrick, 1925)
Anadasmus ischioptila (Meyrick, 1925)
Anadasmus leontodes (Meyrick, 1915)
Anadasmus lithogypsa (Meyrick, 1932)
Anadasmus nonagriella (Walker, 1864)
Anadasmus obmutescens (Meyrick, 1916)
Anadasmus paurocentra (Meyrick, 1912)
Anadasmus pelinitis (Meyrick, 1912)
Anadasmus pelodes (Walsingham, 1913)
Anadasmus plebicola (Meyrick, 1918)
Anadasmus quadratella (Walker, 1864)
Anadasmus sororia (Zeller, 1877)
Anadasmus vacans (Meyrick, 1916)
Anadasmus venosella (Walker, 1864)

References

 
Stenomatinae
Moth genera